In sailing, the great capes are three major capes of the continents in the Southern Ocean—Africa's Cape of Good Hope, Australia's Cape Leeuwin, and South America's Cape Horn.

Sailing 
The traditional clipper route followed the winds of the roaring forties south of the great capes.  Due to the significant hazards they presented to shipping, the great capes became significant landmarks in ocean voyaging. The great capes became common points of reference, though other nearby capes may have been more southern or shared in notability.

Today, the great capes feature prominently in ocean yacht racing, with many races and individual sailors following the clipper route. A circumnavigation via the great capes is considered to be a noteworthy achievement. Sailor Joshua Slocum completed the first solo circumnavigation of the world in 1895–1898, and the Joshua Slocum Society International presented its Level 3 Golden Circle Award to sailors who solo circumnavigated passing the great capes.

In his book The Long Way, Bernard Moitessier tries to express the significance to a sailor of the great capes:

Five southernmost capes 
Other southern capes mark significant points of passage through the southern oceans. The five southernmost capes refer to the five geographically southern mainland (or large island) points on the earth.

Sailors circumnavigating the world have used these five southernmost capes as goals on their route.

References

External links

Solo Circumnavigation of the Earth
Dodge D Morgan's Solo Circumnavigation
Via the Great Southern Capes
Kay Cottee - Australian Sporting Heroes

Extreme points of Earth
Headlands
Headlands of New Zealand
Circumnavigation